Vajraparamita (in Sanskrit), also  is a Bodhisattva of the Buddhist Pantheon, belonging especially to the Esoteric Buddhism tradition of Vajrayana. Kongō-Haramitsu is one of the deities of the Five Mysteries of Vajrasattva, where it appears as one of the four Paramitas. Kongō-Haramitsu is also a central deity of the Buddhist Pantheon of Tō-ji Temple.

Notes

Bodhisattvas
Vajrasattvas
Vajrayana